Dębołęka may refer to the following places:
Dębołęka, Kuyavian-Pomeranian Voivodeship (north-central Poland)
Dębołęka, Łódź Voivodeship (central Poland)
Dębołęka, West Pomeranian Voivodeship (north-west Poland)